Lagoa do Peixe National Park is a national park in the state of Rio Grande do Sul, Brazil.

Location

The Lagoa do Peixe National Park is in the coastal marine biome, and has been registered as a Ramsar Site.
The park was created by decree nº 93.546 of 6 November 1986, and is administered by the Chico Mendes Institute for Biodiversity Conservation.
It covers parts of the municipalities of Mostardas, São José do Norte and Tavares in the state of Rio Grande do Sul.

Environment

The park lies on and between two parallel lines of dunes on the Atlantic coast.
There are two fresh water lagoons in the northern section, Veiana and Pai João, while other lagoons and marshes are salt.
The park includes areas influenced by rivers or lakes, marine areas and intermediate areas, and has a mix of flora growing on the dunes, sandy fields, flood plains and salt and freshwater marshes.

The park is an important resting place for birds on the migratory route between Patagonia and the United States.
Migratory species include red knot (Calidris canutus), common tern (Sterna hirundo), sanderling (Calidris alba), white-rumped sandpiper (Calidris fuscicollis), two-banded plover (Charadrius falklandicus), tawny-throated dotterel (Oreopholus ruficollis), rufous-chested plover (Charadrius modestus), Chilean flamingo (Phoenicopterus chilensis) and Andean flamingo (Phoenicoparrus andinus).
The tuco-tuco (Ctenomys flamarioni) is endemic.

Conservation

The park is classified as IUCN protected area category II (national park).
The basic objectives are preservation of natural ecosystems of great ecological relevance and scenic beauty and enabling scientific research, environmental education, outdoor recreation and eco-tourism.
On 16 April 1991 the park was recognized as an International Reserve of the Western Hemisphere Shorebird Reserve Network.
On 24 May 1993 it was registered as Ramsar Site No. 603.
In 1999 it became an outpost of the Atlantic Forest Biosphere Reserve in Rio Grande do Sul.

Protected species in the park include cinereous harrier (Circus cinereus), Olrog's gull (Larus atlanticus), dot-winged crake (Porzana spiloptera) and royal tern (Thalasseus maximus).

Notes

Sources

Protected areas established in 1986
National parks of Brazil
Protected areas of Rio Grande do Sul
Ramsar sites in Brazil
1986 establishments in Brazil